During the Parade of Nations at the 2019 Pan American Games opening ceremony, on July 26, 2019, 41 athletes bearing the flags of their respective nations lead their national delegations as they paraded into Estadio Nacional in the host city of Lima, Peru

March order
Athletes entered the stadium in an order dictated by tradition. As the host of the first Pan American Games, Argentina entered first. The Peruvian delegation entered last, representing the host nation. The remaining countries entered in Spanish alphabetical order as per Pan American Sports Organization protocol.

List

References

2019 Pan American Games
Parades in Peru